Karak is one of the governorates of Jordan, located south-west of Amman, Jordan's capital. Its capital is Al-Karak. It s bordered by Madaba and the Capital governorates to the north, Ma'an Governorate to the east, Tafilah Governorate to the south, and the Dead Sea to the west.

History

Ancient history
The land of Karak Governorate was the home of the Kingdom of Moab, during the first millennium BC. Their capital and stronghold is believed to be near the city of Al Karak, which was known as the Qir of Moab.

For a brief period of time, the territory came under Persian rule, then the Nabateans took control of it, until the Romans invaded the Levant and occupied their capital, Petra. In the 4th century, a Roman legion, the Legio IV Martia, had a headquarter fortress at Betthorus (now el-Lejjun) in Karak. Around 530 the Byzantine Empire established a vassal state ruled by the Ghassanids. The city of Mu'tah was the site of the first clash between the Muslim Arabs under Muhammad and the Byzantines at the Battle of Mu'tah in 629 AD.

With the coming of the crusaders, the Principality of Kerak was established, after which Kerak was a center front between the Ayyubids and the crusaders.

Modern history
From the 15th century until 1917, Karak was under Ottoman rule, and then later under the Emirate of Transjordan. After the creation of the administrative governorates system in the Hashemite Kingdom of Jordan, Karak became a governorate on 16 January 1966, with Waheeb al-Bitar as its first governor.

Geography

The land of Karak Governorate is situated along the south eastern coast of the Dead Sea and the mountain chain known as the Mountains of Moab. Wadi Mujib, biblically known as Arnon River, flows through the mountains of Karak Governorate and ends in the Dead Sea. The cities in the governorate are located at elevations ranging from over 1000 meters above sea level in the South Mazar Department to 800 meters above sea level in the northern departments to about 330 meters below sea level at Ghor Al-Safi Department.  
The governorate is connected to the rest of Jordan by two highways: 
Highway 65, also known as the Kings Highway
Highway 15, also known as the Desert Highway

Demographics
In 2004, according to the Jordan National Census of that year, the population of the Karak Governorate was 204,185, i.e. 4% of the population of Jordan. The male-to-female ratio was 50.6 to 49.4, Jordanian citizens made up 95.42% Among the Jordanian citizens the male-to-female ratio was 50.38 to 49.62. Of the non-Jordanians, the male-to-female ratio was 55.19 to 44.81.  The estimated population as of 2010 is about 239,000. Muslim form the majority of the Karak Governorate with 70% of its total population and Christians are 30% of its population. Karak presents a practical model of peaceful coexistence between Muslim and Christians. The next census is scheduled for 2014

The population of districts according to census results:

Education
Mutah University is the only university in the governorate, located in the city of Mu'tah, and is one of the largest universities in Jordan by number of students.

Administrative departments
Karak Governorate is divided into 10 departments according to article 7 of the 46th Administrative Divisions System of 2000:

References 

 
Governorates of Jordan